Bexley is a suburb in southern Sydney, in the state of New South Wales, Australia.

History
James Chandler named the suburb after his birthplace, Bexley which is in the south-east of London, England. Chandler bought Sylvester’s Farm in 1822, from Thomas Sylvester who had been granted the land about ten years earlier. That year he was also granted  of land which stretched from what is now Bexley North to most of Rockdale and Kogarah. The estate was heavily timbered and a track through the centre, used by timber-getters, is today called Forest Road. Queen Victoria Street, Gladstone Street and Beaconsfield Street commemorate the British Queen and two of her prime ministers. Chandler was a well-respected citizen and became known locally as the Squire of Bexley, but his property attracted bushrangers, escaped convicts and other odd types. Chandler was not happy with his ill-assortment of neighbours and sold the land to Charles Thompson in 1836. Later it was bought by Charles Tindell, who began subdividing the land by 1856 for home sites.

Lydham Hall, the oldest surviving residence in the area, stands on part of the original land grant of 1822. Joseph Davis settled in this historic residence in the late nineteenth century. Herbert and Frederick Streets are named after his two sons. Henry Kinsela lived on Kinsel Grove. George Preddy occupied Besborough, part of which became Bexley Park.

Dick Stone sold meats in Bexley and Rockdale from 1868. Stone’s Slaughterhouse in Stoney Creek Road began operations in the 1890s. Cattle, sheep and pigs were driven from Homebush to the abattoirs in Kingsgrove until they closed in 1920.

An upsurge in development began after the railway line to Hurstville was opened in 1884. A two-tier wagonette and hansom cab conveyed train travellers to their homes and in 1909 a steam tram ran between Bexley and Arncliffe. Many inns opened in the area including the Man of Kent, the Robin Hood and Little John Inn and the Highbury Barn. On 28 June 1900 the Bexley Ward of Hurstville Municipality seceded to become Bexley council. Bexley Council was merged with Rockdale Council in 1948 to form the Municipality of Rockdale.

Commercial area

Transport
Bexley is currently served by Transit Systems, Transdev NSW and Punchbowl Bus Company bus services. A steam tramway opened on 13 October 1909 and operated from Arncliffe railway station via Firth and Done Streets and then onto Wollongong, Forest and Stoney Creek Roads to Bexley Park, near Preddys Road. It closed on 1 January 1927.

Population

According to the 2016 census of Population, there were 19,733 people usually resident in Bexley.  49.7% of people were born in Australia. The next most common countries of birth were China 6.9%, Lebanon 4.0%, Macedonia 3.5%, Greece 2.8% and New Zealand 1.8%. 36.9% of people only spoke English at home. Other languages spoken at home included Arabic 11.7%, Greek 7.6%, Macedonian 6.5%, Mandarin 6.3% and Cantonese 5.1%. The most common responses were Catholic 21.2%, No Religion 16.7%, Eastern Orthodox 15.9% and Islam 12.9%.

Notable residents
 Patricia Carlon - crime fiction/thriller writer

Gallery

Houses

References

Bayside Council
1822 establishments in Australia
suburbs of Sydney